Karanja is a rural locality in the local government area (LGA) of Derwent Valley in the South-east LGA region of Tasmania. The 2016 census recorded a population of 28 for the state suburb of Karanja.

History 
Karanja was gazetted as a locality in 1959. Karanja is a city in India, named after Saint Karanj. Three ships of this name, and this locality, appear to have been named from this source.

Geography
The Tyenna River forms the north-western boundary. The Derwent Valley Railway line forms part of the northern boundary before passing through to the south-west.

Road infrastructure 
Route B61 (Gordon River Road) runs along the southern boundary. From there Karanja Court provides access to the locality.

See also
 SS Karanja (1865)

References

Towns in Tasmania
Localities of Derwent Valley Council